Arthur Braithwaite (2 September 1880 – 1953) was an Australian cricketer. He played two first-class matches for Tasmania between 1908 and 1909.

See also
 List of Tasmanian representative cricketers

References

External links
 

1880 births
1953 deaths
Australian cricketers
Tasmania cricketers